Pathanamthitta District, is one of the 14 districts in the Indian state of Kerala. The district headquarters is in the town of Pathanamthitta. There are four municipalities in Pathanamthitta: Adoor, Pandalam, Pathanamthitta and Thiruvalla.

According to the 2011 Census of India, the population was 1,197,412, making it the third least populous district in Kerala (out of 14), after Wayanad and Idukki. Pathanamthitta has been declared the first polio-free district in India. The district is 10.03% urbanised. Pathanamthitta is one of the richest districts in India with just 1.17% poverty as of 2013, which places the district among top 5 districts in India with least poverty.

Etymology 
The district capital is located on the banks of the river Achankovil.

History 

It is presumed that the regions that form the district were formerly under the rule of Pandalam, which had connections with the Pandya kingdom. When Pandalam was added to the princely state of Travancore in 1820, the region came under Travancore administration. The Nedumpuram Palace near Thiruvalla belongs to Valluvanad Royal family, who were originally the rulers of Angadippuram in present-day Malappuram district.

The district was formed on 1 November 1982 as a reward to K. K. Nair, who was the then Pathanamthitta MLA, by K. Karunakaran. The formation was done by incorporating various portions of the erstwhile Kollam, Alappuzha and Idukki districts. While the taluks Pathanamthitta, Adoor,  were taken from Kollam district, Ranni, Konni and Kozhencherry from Idukki district, Pandalam and Thiruvalla  were taken from Alappuzha district.

Cultural revival 
Pathanamthitta being also a land of culture and learning could bring forth the literary talents of two centuries together in single volume named Desathuti: Pathanamthitta Kavithakal. Unnikrishnan Poozhikkad collected 184 poems of different poets of Pathanamthitta starting from 18th century..

Geography
The district is bordered by the districts Kottayam and Idukki districts in the north, Alappuzha district in the west, Kollam district in the south. To the east it borders the Tenkasi district of the Tamil Nadu state. Devar Mala is the highest point in Pathnamthitta District.

The district can be divided into three natural geographical regions: the highland, the midland and the lowland. The highland stretches through the Western Ghats, where the hills are tall and covered with thick forests. Western Ghats maintains an average altitude of around 800 m. It descends to the smaller hills of midland in the centre and finally to the lowland. The lowland with its abundance of coconut trees, lies along the eastern borders of Alappuzha district. (western part of Tiruvalla Taluk)

Forest 
This is approximately 50% of the total district area. The forest area can broadly be classified as evergreen, semi-evergreen and moist deciduous. The forest is the main source of raw materials for wood based industrial units. Timber is the most important produce.

Rivers 
Three important rivers flow through the district. These rivers originate from various mountains of the Western Ghats mountain range. The Pamba, which is the third longest river in Kerala, has its origin in Pulachimala. The Achankovil river originates from Pasukida Mettu, and Manimala river originates from the Thattamalai hills. A small portion of Kallada river also falls in the southern border of the district. Pamba, Achankovil and Manimala rivers together drain more than 70% of the total area of Pathanamthitta.

Administration 

The district headquarters is at Pathanamthitta town. The district administration is headed by the District Collector. She is assisted by five Deputy Collectors holding charges of general matters, revenue recovery, land acquisition, land reforms and election.
Under the three tier system of panchayat in rural areas, Pathanamthitta has one district panchayat, 9 block panchayat and 57 grama panchayats.
Under the single tier system in urban areas, there are 4 municipalities in the district.

As per the Delimitation of Parliamentary and Assembly Constituencies Order, 2008, Pathanamthitta has five Assembly constituencies, down from eight. However, the district was unified into a single Parliamentary constituency, thus contributing a seat to the Lok Sabha. The Pathanamthitta parliamentary constituency is formed by including all the five state legislative assembly constituencies of the district along with two other assembly constituencies in the neighbouring Kottayam district.

Pathanamthitta town is the administrative headquarters of the Pathanamthitta district. The district is divided into two revenue divisions- Thiruvalla and Adoor.

Municipal towns

There are 4 municipal towns in the district. They are:

Legislative representation

There is a Lok Sabha constituency in Pathanamthitta: Pathanamthitta.

There are five Kerala Legislative Assembly seats in Pathanamthitta district.

Taluks

The district is divided into two revenue divisions which together incorporate six Taluks within them.

Taluks in the Thiruvalla Revenue Division are:

Taluks in the Adoor Revenue Division are:

Revenue villages
Pathanamthitta district is divided into 70 revenue villages for the ease and decentralisation of its revenue administration. They are further incorporated into 6 taluks as eludicated below.

Thiruvalla Taluk

 Eraviperoor
 Kadapra
 Kaviyoor
 Kavumbhagom
 Koipuram
 Kuttappuzha
 Kuttoor
 Nedumpuram
 Niranam
 Peringara
 Thiruvalla
 Thottapuzhassery

Mallappally Taluk

 Anicadu
 Ezhumattoor
 Kallooppara
 Kottangal
 Kunnamthanam
 Mallappally
 Perumpetty
 Puramattam
 Thelliyoor

Ranni Taluk

 Athikkayam
 Ayiroor
 Cherukole
 Chethakkal
 Kollamula
 Perunad
 Ranni
 Ranni-Angadi
 Ranni-Pazhavangadi
 Vadasserikara

Kozhencherry Taluk

 Aranmula
 Chenneerkara
 Elanthoor
 Kidangannoor
 Kozhencherry
 Kulanada
 Mezhuveli
 Naranganam
 Omallur
 Pathanamthitta

Adoor Taluk

 Adoor
 Angadickal
 Enadimangalam
 Enathu
 Erathu
 Ezhamkulam
 Kadampanad
 Kodumon
 Kurampala
 Pallickal
 Pandalam
 Pandalam Thekkekara
 Peringanadu
 Thumpamon

Konni Taluk

 Ayravon
 Aruvappulam
 Chittar
 Kalanjoor
 Konni
 Konnithazham
 Koodal
 Malayalappuzha
 Mylapra
 Pramadom
 Seethathodu
 Thannithode
 Vallicode
 Vallicode-Kottayam

Demographics 

According to the 2011 census Pathanamthitta district has a population of 1,197,412, roughly equal to the nation of Timor-Leste or the US state of Rhode Island. This gives it a ranking of 399th in India (out of a total of 640). Its population growth rate over the decade 2001–2011 was −3.12%. Pathanamthitta has a sex ratio of 1129 females for every 1000 males, and a literacy rate of 96.93%. Scheduled Castes and Scheduled Tribes make up 13.74% and 0.68% of the population respectively.

Malayalam is the predominant language, spoken by 99.13% of the population. Small minorities of Tamil speakers live in urban areas.

According to the Census of India 2001, the district had a population of 1,234,016 with a density of 467 persons per square kilometre. This is the lowest density in the State after Idukki and Wayanad. Schedule tribes and castes comprise 13% of the total population. The female to male ratio is 1094:1000, which is the highest among the districts in the State.

Religion 

Hinduism (57%) is followed by the majority of population of Pathanamthitta. Christians (Malankara Orthodox, Marthoma Church and Pentecostal) are majority (38%) form significant minority.

Transport 
Trivandrum International Airport (TRV) at Thiruvananthapuram and Cochin International Airport at Kochi are the nearest airports. Aranmula International Airport was planned at Aranmula, 18 km from Pathanamthitta town but was cancelled in 2018. The Pathanamthitta Sabarimala airport is being planned in Konni.

Education

Tourism 

With a number of fairs and festivals, Pathanamthitta district is known as the "headquarters of pilgrimage tourism." The district receives an estimated 3 to 4 million pilgrims during the festival season of Sabarimala temple. The temple is dedicated to the Hindu deity, Ayyappan. The district is a host to Asia's biggest and the world's second largest Christian convention, the Maramon Convention

It is an eight-day Christian gathering in the month of February, conducted by the Malankara Marthoma Syrian Church and dedicated to gospel preaching by renowned Christian missionaries from all over the world, and held at Maramon on the sand-bed of Pamba River. The three-day Christian gathering is held at Makkamkunnu, Pathanamthitta known as Makkamkunnu Convention by Malankara Orthodox Church. The Cherukolpuzha Hindu convention, Kadammanitta devi temple, the 10th century Kaviyoor mahadeva temple, Parthasarathi temple at Aranmula and anikkattilammakshethram are some of the Hindu religious places of interest. 

The most important and famous Christian center is Parumala St Peters, St Paul's and St Gregorios Orthodox Church (http://parumalachurch.org) famous for the tomb of Saint Gregorios (Parumala Thirumeni). Millions of Pilgrims visit this church annually.

St. George Orthodox Church, Chandanapally or Chandanapally Valiyapalli is one of the biggest churches in South India, located at a village named Chandanapally, Pathanamthitta District. 

St. George Orthodox Church, Mylapra or Mylapra Valiyapalli or Chakkittayil palli (ചക്കിട്ടേൽ പള്ളി) is one of the famous Georgian pilgrim centre which is very close to Pathanamthitta District headquarters. 

Some of the other Christian places of interest are St. Mary's Orthodox church at Niranam, St. Thomas Ecumenical Church at Nilackal, the Mor Ignatius Dayro Manjinikkara of the Syriac Orthodox Church of India, St Stephen's Jacobite Church, Parumala Seminary and St. Mary's Orthodox Cathedral, Thumpamon also known as Thumpamon Valiya Pally, headquarters of Thumapmon Diocese of Malankara Orthodox Church. The churches at Niranam and Nilackal (Chayal) are believed to be among the seven churches founded by St. Thomas the Apostle. The Muslim colourful Chandanakkudam festival of the Jama — Al Mosque at Pathanamthitta town attracts many visitors. Although these places are religious in nature, they attract people from all faiths.

The district is known for its reserve forest and wild life. Perunthenaruvi water falls, Kakki reservoir surrounded by forest and wild animals, dam sites at Moozhyar and Maniyar, elephant training centre at Konni, Charalkunnu hill station are ideal locations for nature enthusiasts. Trekking to the Sabari Hills during January to March is also organized by Pathanamthitta District Tourism Promotion Council (DTPC).

Pathanamthitta district has places known for its historical importance. Among them are, ancient Valiyakoickal Temple and Palace at Pandalam, monument of Velu Thampi Dalawa at Mannadi and the Muloor Smarakom (Muloor memorial). Pandalam was the capital of the ancient Travancore kingdom.

The district has other tourist attractions. Aranmula is a major attraction for its famous metal mirrors and snake boat race. The school of traditional arts attracts foreign visitors. Founded by French artist Louba Schild, the school teaches kathakali, classical dance, classical music as well as kalarippayattu. The palace at Aranmula Aranmula kottaram has a history of 200 years.

The Cherukolpuzha Convention, in Pathanamthitta is an important religious convention of the Hindus. It is held at Cherukole on the sand banks of Pamba River, usually in February every year. It is organized by the Ayroor-Cherukolpuzha Hindumatha Maha Mandalam at Vidyadhiraja Nagar at Ayroor village.

The Maramon Convention, one of the largest Christian convention in Asia, is held at Maramon, Pathanamthitta, Kerala, India annually during the month of February on the vast sand-bed of the Pampa River next to the Kozhencherry Bridge. It is organised by Mar Thoma Evangelistic Association, the missionary wing of the Mar Thoma Church.

The Church of God (Full Gospel) in India, Kerala State, holds its annual convention in Tiruvalla town center. This is usually held in the month of January and is a large gathering of Pentecostal Christians.

Flora and fauna 
The forests of the district have excellent wild life habitats. A variety of animals and birds can be found. Tigers, elephants, gaur, deer, monkeys and other wild animals are found in the forest. Giant squirrel, lion-tailed macaques, barking deer and bear can also be spotted in the reserve. Malabar grey hornbill and great Indian hornbill are found. Wide variety of other birds such as sunbirds, woodpeckers and kingfishers can also be seen.

The existence of the wildlife habitat is under threat from various areas. Pollution from fertilizer and industries and illegal sand mining are the major threats. Issues connected to Sabarimala pilgrimage such as clearing of forest land and large amount of waste discharged also threatens the habitat.

Sports

The Aranmula Boat Race is part of a festival celebrated during the month of September. Though the snake boat race is also performed at nearby places, the race held at Aranmula is unique because of the boats' shape and design. Maramadimatsaram (Ox Race) is another such seasonal sport. This is held as part of the largest annual cattle fair of Central Travancore region. The race is held in three categories.

Notable people

See also
 List of people from Pathanamthitta district
 Alappuzha district
 Idukki district
 Kottayam district
 Kollam district

Further reading

References

External links

 
 Pathanamthitta district official website
 Pathanamthitta District administration

 
Districts of Kerala
1982 establishments in Kerala